Bao'an may refer to:

 Bonan people, or Bao'an (保安族), an ethnic group living in Qinghai and Gansu
 Bao'an dialect, spoken in Shenzhen and the New Territories, Hong Kong

Places in China 
 Bao'an District (宝安区), Shenzhen
 Bao'an County (寶安縣), the predecessor of the modern city of Shenzhen and Hong Kong
 Shenzhen Bao'an International Airport (深圳宝安国际机场), the main airport of Shenzhen
 Zhidan County, formerly named Bao'an (保安), in Shaanxi
 Bao'an Subdistrict, Zhidan County, formerly Bao'an Town
Towns (保安镇)
 Bao'an, Lianzhou, Guangdong
 Bao'an, Ye County, Henan
 Bao'an, Daye, Hubei, in Daye City, Hubei

Townships (保安乡)
 Bao'an Township, Xiushan County, in Xiushan Tujia and Miao Autonomous County, Chongqing
 Bao'an Township, Du'an County, in Du'an Yao Autonomous County, Guangxi
 Bao'an Township, Ningyuan County, in Ningyuan County, Hunan
 Bao'an Township, Suqian, in Suyu District, Suqian, Jiangsu
 Bao'an Township, Jiangshan, Zhejiang